The 1979 FIA European Formula 3 Championship was the fifth edition of the FIA European Formula 3 Championship. The championship consisted of 12 rounds across the continent. Future Formula One world champion, Alain Prost took overall victory in five of these rounds which, among other results, made him the drivers champion for 1979, with Michael Bleekemolen finishing in second and Slim Borgudd third.

Calendar

Results

Championship standings

Drivers' championship

References

European Formula 3
FIA European Formula 3 Championship